Live at Brixton Academy is a live album from German digital hardcore group Atari Teenage Riot, recorded and released in 1999. The album was recorded while they supported Nine Inch Nails on tour, and contains no songs from any of the past albums, just harsh noise. Live at Brixton Academy was ATR's final album before they disbanded in 2000, their actual final release being the Rage EP.

Reception

Select gave the album a one star rating out of five. The review stated that "it works almost as a parody of how an avant-noise album is supposed to sound", describing the album as "mercifully clocking in at under 30 minutes" and criticizing the siren wails which were described as "the electronic equivalent of histrionic guitar solo".

Track listing
(Untitled) – 26:38

References

External links
Atari Teenage Riot at MySpace
Official Digital Hardcore Recordings site

Atari Teenage Riot albums
1999 live albums
Albums recorded at the Brixton Academy